The Truth of Lie is a 2011 German psycho-thriller directed by Roland Reber. It was first shown at the Hof International Film Festival in October 2011, and released in 2012.

Background 
Shot on an Arri Alexa camera, it had its theatrical release on 29 March 2012 in German cinemas and its DVD and Blu-ray release on 27 July 2012.

Festival attendances 
 Hof International Film Festival, Oct 2011
 International Film Festival of India, Nov 2011
 International Chennai Filmfestival, India, Dec 2011
 Pune International Filmfestival, India, Jan 2012
 Fantasporto International Filmfestival, Feb 2012
 Sitges International Filmfestival, Oct 2012
 Cairo International Film Festival, Dec 2012

References

External links 
 Official Page

2011 thriller films
2011 films
German thriller films
2010s German films